Guardiola odontophylla is a rare North American species of plants in the family Asteraceae. It is found only in northern Mexico in the state of Durango.

Guardiola odontophylla is a branching perennial with a purple stem, hairless and appearing whitish because of a waxy coating. Flower heads have both ray flowers and disc flowers.

References

odontophylla
Flora of Durango
Plants described in 1899